Helmut Scholz is a German politician who is serving as an The Left (Germany) Member of the European Parliament.

He is a member of the Working Group on the Conference on the Future of Europe.

References

External links

Living people
MEPs for Germany 2009–2014
MEPs for Germany 2014–2019
MEPs for Germany 2019–2024
The Left (Germany) MEPs
Year of birth missing (living people)